The Midnight Man is a 1974 American neo noir mystery film starring and co-directed by Burt Lancaster. The film also stars Susan Clark, Cameron Mitchell, Morgan Woodward, Harris Yulin, Robert Quarry, Joan Lorring, Lawrence Dobkin, Ed Lauter, Mills Watson, Charles Tyner and Catherine Bach.

Plot
Former Chicago policeman Jim Slade is paroled from prison, where he had served time for shooting his wife's lover in their bed. He goes to live with his married friends Quartz and Judy in a small town where he has been offered a job as a night watchman at a college.

A college coed is murdered and local sheriff Casey tries to pin the crime on a creepy janitor who spouts biblical revelation while hiding pornography. Slade pursues an unauthorized investigation of his own.

Natalie, the murdered student, is the daughter of Senator Clayborne, who subsequently receives blackmail letters related to tapes of her confession to a psychiatric counselor that she had an incestuous relationship with her father. Slade questions possible suspects, including the senator, Natalie's estranged boyfriend Arthur King (who declares to Slade that the generation gap "just got a little wider"), psychology professor Dean Collins and a nerdy student whose taped psychiatric rant was also stolen.

All the while, Slade is warned against overstepping his authority as a mere night watchman, no longer a cop, by his parole officer Linda Thorpe and by Quartz. A brief affair between Slade and Thorpe begins. A family of thugs led by a Ma Barker-type mother arrives, and they are revealed to be agents paid by some corrupt members of the sheriff's department to do their dirty work.

Slade realizes that the parole officer and Quartz are the perpetrators of the murder, because only Quartz could have known a certain critical clue involved in the cover-up. Sheriff Casey arrests Quartz. As they depart, Slade confronts Thorpe, who produces the stolen tapes that are hidden in her freezer.

The sheriff offers Slade an apology and a job even though Slade cannot hold a position with the law as a convicted felon.

Cast
 Burt Lancaster as Jim Slade 
 Susan Clark as Linda Thorpe 
 Cameron Mitchell as Quartz Willinger
 Morgan Woodward as Senator Phillip Clayborne 
 Harris Yulin as Sheriff Jack Casey 
 Robert Quarry as Dr. Prichette 
 Joan Lorring as Judy Willinger
 Lawrence Dobkin as Waldo Mason 
 Ed Lauter as Leroy 
 Mills Watson as "Cash" 
 Charles Tyner as R.W. Ewing 
 Catherine Bach as Natalie Clayborne
 Bill Lancaster as Arthur King
 Quinn Redeker as Swanson
 Eleanor Ross as Nell
 Richard Winterstein as Virgil
 William T. Hicks as Charlie
 Peter Dane as Karl Metterman
 Linda Kelsey as Betty Childress
 William Splawn as Eddie Lamar
 Susan MacDonald as Elaine
 Joel Gordon Kravitz as Lester Pearlman
 Nick Cravat as Sam, The Gardener
 Rodney Stevens as Jimmy Gill
 Weems Oliver Baskin III as The Bartender
 Jean Perkins as Nurse
 Harold N. Cooledge Jr. as Dean Collins
 Gene Lehfeldt as Casey's Driver
 William Clark as Deputy
 Elizabeth Black as The Bus Dispatcher
 Rachel Ray as Parolee
 David Garrison as The Photographer
 Hugh Parsons as The Grocery Clerk
 Lonnie Kay as The Hostess
 G. Warren Smith as The Director
 Lucille Meredith as The Radio Evangelist
 Mal Alberts as The Basketball Announcer

Production
Burt Lancaster shared directing credit with Roland Kibbee, and shared writing credit with Kibbee and author David Anthony, upon whose 1969 novel The Midnight Lady and the Mourning Man the film was based. The film was not a major success and Lancaster did not consider it to be among his better work. Other than 1955's The Kentuckian, this was Lancaster's only film as a director.

The film marked the first screen appearance of future television star Catherine Bach.

The Midnight Man was filmed in Clemson and the counties of Anderson and Pickens in South Carolina. Filming began on February 13, 1973 with the opening scenes in which Jim Slade arrives by bus.

The film was released on June 10, 1974 in New York and nationwide on June 14. It premiered at the Astro III theater in Clemson on March 14, 1974 with a red-carpet ceremony.

References

External links

1974 films
American mystery films
Films scored by Dave Grusin
Films directed by Burt Lancaster
Universal Pictures films
Films based on American novels
Films produced by Burt Lancaster
1970s English-language films
1970s American films